The Journal of Rheumatology is a peer-reviewed medical journal addressing topics in rheumatology and arthritis. It is an official journal of the Canadian Rheumatology Association. From 1992 to 2020 the journal has published the proceedings of Outcome Measures in Rheumatology (OMERACT) conferences .

References

External links 
 

Rheumatology journals
Publications established in 1974
Monthly journals
English-language journals